McRae–Helena is a city in the U.S. state of Georgia, formed on January 1, 2015, by the merger of the two cities of McRae and Helena. McRae–Helena is the county seat of Telfair County.

It is the largest city in Telfair County, with a population of 6,253 in 2020. This includes the population held as inmates at McRae Correctional Institution.

History
On January 1, 2015, McRae and the adjacent town of Helena merged to form McRae–Helena. This merge was initiated when Helena discovered it could no longer manage its wastewater supply. While it seemed to make sense to have nearby McRae take over Helena's water services, it would have not only reduced Helena's revenue, but left Helena with only two municipal services. The cities were united under House Bill 967, sponsored by Representative Jimmy Pruett of the 149th district. It was signed into law by Governor Nathan Deal on April 10, 2014.

Geography
McRae–Helena is located in northern Telfair County at  (32.064508, -82.898251).

The Little Ocmulgee River flows just northeast of the city limits, while Sugar Creek passes through the southwest border of the city.

Transportation
Several highways travel through McRae–Helena Area. U.S. Route 23 (US 23), along with US 341/SR 27 travel through the city as a one-way pair using Martin Luther King Jr. Boulevard (formerly Railroad Street), heading northwest  to Eastman and  Oak Street heading southeast  to Hazlehurst, while US 280/US 319/US 441/SR 30/SR 31 travel through as Third Avenue, crossing US 23/US 341/SR 27 in the center of the city. US 280/SR 30 heads northeast  to Vidalia and west  to Cordele, while US 319/US 441/SR 31 heads south  to the small town of Jacksonville and north  to Dublin.

Major railroad lines include the former Macon and Brunswick Railroad, now the Brunswick Division of Norfolk Southern Railway which passes through both former cities, and a former Seaboard Air Line Railroad line now owned by the Heart of Georgia Railroad that passed only through Helena. A junction between these lines exists in the former Helena.

Sites of interest
Located in downtown McRae–Helena is Liberty Square, home of a Statue of Liberty replica that is one-twelfth the size of the original. The square is also the site of a replica of the Liberty Bell and a marble memorial to Telfair County residents who died in military service.

On the outskirts of McRae–Helena is the Talmadge Home. This historic home was occupied by two former Georgia governors, Eugene Talmadge and Herman Eugene Talmadge. McRae–Helena was the birthplace of Marion B. Folsom (1893–1976), a longtime executive of the Eastman Kodak Company who served as the United States Secretary of Health, Education, and Welfare during the Eisenhower administration.

Famous railfan photographer William B. Folsom is buried in McRae–Helena.

Education

Telfair County School District
The Telfair County School District holds pre-school to grade twelve, and consists of one elementary school, a middle school, and a high school. The district has 112 full-time teachers and over 1,648 students.
 Telfair County Elementary School
 Telfair County Middle School
 Telfair County High School
 Telfair County Pre-K

Higher education
 Oconee Fall Line Technical College - McRae–Helena Campus

Demographics

In 2015 it was estimated there were 8,754 people, including the population held as inmates at McRae Correctional Institution, residing in the city. McRae-Helena as Telfair County's largest city is the cultural and economic center of the county. The city of McRae-Helena has a Trading Area of 25,000 people.

2020 census

As of the 2020 United States census, there were 6,253 people, 1,989 households, and 1,456 families residing in the city.

Economy

Major employers in McRae–Helena include:
 Husqvarna
 McRae Correctional Institution  
 City of McRae–Helena  
 Coca-Cola Bottling Plant 
 Golden Peanut Company 
 Telfair State Prison
 Little Ocmulgee State Park
 Cook Petro 
 Griffins Warehouse–McRae, LLC

Arts and culture

Museums and other points of interest
The Telfair County museum of history

See also

 List of cities in Georgia (U.S. state)
 Telfair County Courthouse and Jail

References

External links

 City of McRae–Helena official website
 Telfair Enterprise newspaper

Cities in Georgia (U.S. state)
Cities in Telfair County, Georgia
Cities in Wheeler County, Georgia
County seats in Georgia (U.S. state)
Populated places established in 2015